Be Still is a Canadian drama film, directed by Elizabeth Lazebnik and released in 2021. An adaptation of Janet Munsil's theatrical play of the same name, the film is a biographical portrait of Hannah Maynard, a photographer from Victoria, British Columbia who was an unheralded innovator in the artistic genre of surrealism.

The film stars Piercey Dalton as Maynard and Daniel Arnold as her husband Richard, with its supporting cast including James McDougall, Amber Taylor, Meredith Hama-Brown, Sophie Merasty, Anja Savcic, Cameron Grierson, Brendan Taylor, Dakota Guppy and Ariel Ladret.

The film premiered at the 2021 Vancouver International Film Festival.

The film received two Vancouver Film Critics Circle nominations at the Vancouver Film Critics Circle Awards 2021, for Best British Columbia Film and Best Actress in a Canadian Film (Dalton). Lazebnik was also nominated for the One to Watch award.

References

External links

2021 films
Canadian biographical drama films
Canadian historical drama films
English-language Canadian films
Films shot in British Columbia
Films set in British Columbia
Films based on Canadian plays
Biographical films about artists
2020s English-language films
2020s Canadian films